General Gonzaga may refer to:

Annibale Gonzaga (1602–1668), Holy Roman Empire general
Maurizio Ferrante Gonzaga (1861–1938), Italian general
Gianfrancesco I Gonzaga, Marquess of Mantua (1395–1444), Venetian Armies general